Randal Hume Keynes, OBE, FLS (born 29 July 1948) is a British conservationist, author, and great-great-grandson of Charles Darwin.

Family background 
Keynes was born in Cambridge, England. He is the son of the Hon. Anne Pinsent (née Adrian) and physiologist Richard Keynes. His maternal grandparents were Hester Adrian, Baroness Adrian, mental health worker, and Edgar Adrian, 1st Baron Adrian, electrophysiologist and recipient of the 1932 Nobel Prize for Physiology. His paternal grandfather was the surgeon Geoffrey Keynes, brother to the economist John Maynard Keynes. Randal Keynes is the brother of two Cambridge professors, Simon (historian) and Roger (medical scientist).

Randal Keynes has two children with Zelfa Cecil Hourani, also from a prominent intellectual family, originally from Lebanon. Hourani's father, Cecil, was an advisor to the late Tunisian president Habib Bourguiba, and his two brothers were Albert, a major historian of the Middle East, and George, philosopher, historian, and classicist. Randal and Zelfa's son, Skandar Keynes (born 1991), is a political advisor and former actor best known for his role as Edmund Pevensie in the Narnia films. They also have a daughter, Soumaya Keynes (born 1989), who has appeared in various productions for BBC Radio 4.

Life and career 
Keynes was educated at Marlborough College and New College, Oxford. He is a distinguished supporter of Humanists UK.

He campaigned successfully against the redevelopment of King's Cross station and for the preservation of the Caledonian Road neighbourhood in central London. He recalls one of the turning points as his persuasion of two members of the House of Lords to ask the government to guarantee the funding of the project; when the ministers declined to, the bill fell.

The Darwin connection 
Keynes is the author of the intimate exploration of his famous ancestry, Annie's Box, subtitled Darwin, His Daughter, and Human Evolution (2001), a book about the relationship between Darwin and his daughter Annie, whose early death deeply affected him. The 2009 film Creation is based on this book.

He has taken a leading role in the campaign to have Down House, Darwin's former home, designated a World Heritage Site.

He was the author of two Oxford Dictionary of National Biography articles on Anne Darwin and William Erasmus Darwin in 2005.

Ancestry

See also 
Keynes family

References

External links 
 
 BBC interview with Randal Keynes

1948 births
Living people
Alumni of New College, Oxford
British humanists
Charles Darwin biographers
Darwin–Wedgwood family
Randal
Officers of the Order of the British Empire
People educated at Marlborough College
Fellows of the Linnean Society of London
People from Cambridge
English humanists